Fail-safes in nanotechnology are devices or features integrated with nanotechnology which, in the event of failure, respond in a way that will cause no harm, or at least a minimum of harm, to other devices or personnel. Fail-safe principles are governed by national standards and engineering practices, and are widely used in conventional engineering design. It is possible to scale down macro-scale fail-safe principles and devices for similar applications at the nano-scale.

A predominant challenge to the social acceptance of nanotechnology is concerned with the medical use of nanostructures in the human body. While any structure for medical use would be developed to be bio-compatible and harmless, sound engineering design must take into account all possibilities of failure. Thus, the design would include ways to manipulate the structures in the body in the event of failure.

Ferrous nanoparticles
Many researchers are looking into creating nano-scale robots (“nanobots”), for the purpose of undertaking tasks where only robots on the nano scale can be used, such as inside the human body. These robots would have the ability to construct other nanostructures or perform medical procedures, and will be introduced into the body via an injection. The robots’ shells and circuits would be made of ferrous nanoparticles so that a magnetic field could be used to prevent or manipulate their movement. In case of failure or malfunction, a small EMP or an MRI could be used to deactivate the nanobots. Both techniques induce an electromagnetic field, corrupting the memory and shorting out the circuitry of any electronic device within range.

Amino acids
Researchers are pursuing the building of nanostructures using amino acids. Nanostructures that are created using amino acids are constructed using only synthetic types of amino acids, which tags these structures with unique molecules. These engineered amino acids essentially form synthetic proteins that differ from the naturally occurring proteins in the human body. This difference in the engineered amino acids makes these proteins easy to isolate and target. In case of failure or malfunction, it is possible to identify these proteins using the specifically targeted molecules, which act as a flag to indicate the location of the target. Then, another mechanism would be used to isolate them and deactivate them.

DNA

DNA within our bodies naturally breaks down, replicates itself, and rebuilds itself every time a cell divides. These processes are all controlled and completed by various enzymes. DNA molecules are composed of corresponding base pair nucleotides in a double-helix formation, which makes these processes very efficient, accurate, and predictable. Due to the ease with which DNA molecules can be fashioned, many publications in the academic society are geared towards creating nanostructures using DNA. With a DNA-based nano-device, synthetic proteins could be created, designed to deactivate a nano-device. These synthetic proteins would be injected into the body to break down the DNA and render a nano-device harmless in the event of a malfunction.

Biological proteins within the human body serve three main functions: they are structural building blocks, enzymes, and facilitate cellular signaling. Synthetic proteins could be developed as a form of indicator and attached to a DNA-based nano-device. This indicator would then be used for the purpose of monitoring nano-devices in the human body. If all DNA-based nano-devices were closely monitored in the human body, they could be controlled quickly in the event of a malfunction.

Programming
In nanotechnology, particularly in nanobots, the need for a sound programming architecture is very important due to a potentially higher risk of damage in the event of a malfunction. A two-layer approach can be used to control nano-devices: (1) by providing a preprogrammed fail-safe functionality in case of anticipated failures; and (2) a remote-controlled override for use in unforeseen situations. The “remote”-controlled nano-device would require a specialist in the room, to guide the nanobot throughout the procedure.

Cellular engineering
Many researchers are developing methods that use bacteria to deliver drugs. These bacteria can be “programmed” to perform a specific task, and can be directed to go to targeted locations in the body. However, the bacteria may damage healthy organs or fail to deliver the medicine to the sick organ in the case of a malfunction. In such cases, a fail-safe mechanism is required to neutralize the bacteria and prevent damage. An antibiotic is generally suitable as the fail-safe agent.

References

Nanotechnology